Chorreh (also Romanized as Choreh and Chorrah; also known as Chavareh, Chorā, and Churra) is a village in Dasht-e Veyl Rural District, Rahmatabad and Blukat District, Rudbar County, Gilan Province, Iran. At the 2006 census, its population was 504, in 115 families.

References 

Populated places in Rudbar County